Mr. Kotsky is an 1891 children's opera by the Ukrainian composer Mykola Lysenko, with a libretto by Dniprova Chayka.

References

Sources

Further reading
 

 

Operas
Ukrainian-language operas
Operas by Mykola Lysenko
1891 operas
Children's operas